Pha̍k-oa-chhi (白話字) is a Latin-based writing system for the Nanchang dialect of the Gan language. Pha̍k-oa-chhi is based on Pe̍h-ōe-jī for Hokkien, and it is also related to other orthographies as Pha̍k-fa-sṳ for Hakka, Bǽh-oe-tu for Hainanese, Bàng-uâ-cê for Foochow, and Pe̍h-uē-jī for Teochew.

Alphabet

Consonants

Vowels

Monophthongs

Diphthongs

Tone

External links
 http://starling.rinet.ru/cgi-bin/query.cgi?basename=\data\china\doc&root=config&morpho=0

Languages of China
Romanization of Chinese
Gan Chinese
Latin-script orthographies